The San Jose Flea Market, located in Berryessa district of San Jose, California, was founded by George Bumb Sr. in March 1960. He had the idea to open a flea market while working in the solid waste and landfill business. He witnessed abundant items thrown away every day and realized he could make a profit from these discarded items. After visiting swap meets in Los Angeles and Paris’ Thieves Market for inspiration, George Bumb Sr. established the San Jose Flea Market at 1590 Berryessa Road in San Jose, California. He bought 120 acres (49 ha) of an old meat-processing plant and remodeled it to create a market with an initial 20 vendors and only 100 customers per day.

Operations

Management
The San Jose Flea Market has been owned and operated by the Bumb family since its inception. Brian Bumb Sr., son of George Bumb Sr., supervised and was part owner of the San Jose Flea Market along his other brothers, George Bumb Jr., and Timothy Bumb.  Other members of the Bumb family own vendor stalls, work at food carts, and have managerial positions within the Flea Market. Joe Bumb, cousin of Brian Bumb, owns American Precious Metals, an open-air store within the flea market that sells mostly jewelry.

Attractions

The eight miles (13 km) worth of aisles allows for over 2000 vendors to sell an array of goods. In 1987, the Flea Market claimed to have 2,400 vendors and more than 4 million visitors per year. With a population and land mass larger than some small towns, the Flea Market is a major contributor to the income of many local families. Some of the items found at the Flea Market include jewelry, furniture, clothing, fruit, vegetables, shoes, collectibles, toys, books, cars, car stereo equipment, artwork, tools, toiletries, cosmetics, and cookware, among other things.

Along with the material items sold at the Flea Market, there are also many restaurants that are owned and operated by The Flea Market, Inc. and sell both American and Mexican food. Additionally, the Flea Market features traveling food carts that sell beer, soda, and churros. The largest section of the Flea Market is its Farmers Market, which stretches a quarter of a mile through the market and contains fruit and vegetables from California’s farmers.

The Flea Market features a variety of entertainment options every weekend. There are two stages on the Flea Market grounds, one of which consistently reserved for a Mexican Mariachi band. A vintage carousel, an arcade, three playgrounds, and carnival rides are among the attractions developed at the Flea Market for children.

Site
The entire  site is divided into a northern area (north of Berryessa) and a southern area (south of Berryessa). The northern area was used for Flea Market parking prior to redevelopment into a transit-oriented residences after 2007; the southern area retains the Flea Market and a smaller parking lot.

In June of 2020, The Berryessa/North San José station opened up, allowing for access to the site via BART which serves as a connector rail service for much of the San Francisco Bay Area region.

History
The San Jose Flea Market was originally known as the Berryessa Flea Market, located at 12000 Berryessa Road (near the intersection with Lundy, slightly east of the current location).

Fire
On Wednesday, November 29, 2006, a fire burned down 24 stands of Produce Row at the San Jose Flea Market. At 6:02 p.m, a 911 call was made and dozens of fire crews and a helicopter arrived to put out the flames.  Although the fire was contained at 7:15 p.m, $200,000 worth of merchandise was destroyed. Burnt nuts, fruit, plants, and plastic were strewn all over the ground. Theresa Bumb, daughter of Brian Bumb Sr., stated that they would do their best to help those who were affected by the fire by offering free or reduced rent.

Future developments

On August 14, 2007, the San Jose City Council approved the proposal to rezone the property on Berryessa Road to allow for a 2,800-house development. The Council took suggestions from the public and concluded in an approval of the motion by a 10 to 1 vote. The lone disapproving vote was cast because the Council member felt the requirements the city gave the Bumb family were excessive. At the time the proposal was approved, Bumb family expressed no immediate plans or timeline to develop the Flea Market grounds. 

In January 2019, the San Jose City Council held a community meeting presenting proposed plans for a mix of housing, retail, parks and a future medical building on the land north of Berryessa Road. A significant part of this area was previously used as parking for the flea market.  A large retail center including a Safeway and CVS Pharmacy have since been developed and opened on the northwest corner of Berryessa and Sierra Rd.  The large triangular section of land south of Berryessa Rd on which the flea market shops and stands are currently located is proposed for commercial buildings.

In popular culture
 The Flea Market is a key setting in Khaled Hosseini's novel The Kite Runner.

References

External links
San Jose Flea Market History
"Public Eye" The Metro Silicon Valley. 2000-8-24.
"Family Feud" The Metro Silicon Valley. 1999-7-1.
"High Class Joints" The Metro Silicon Valley. 2000-9-7.
California Business Portal Corporations
 Bailey, Brandon. "Fairgrounds Floated as New Flea Market Site". San Jose Mercury News. 2007-4-15.
 Bailey, Brandon. "Vendors Rally to Save Flea Market". San Jose Mercury News. 2007-4-25.
 Barnacle, Betty. "5 Seized In Theft of Tucks Pickups Taken At Flea Market". San Jose Mercury News. 1990-1-31.
 Barnacle, Betty. "10 Arrested in Flea- Market Raid On Fakes". San Jose Mercury News. 1990-12-18.
 Barnacle, Betty. "Counterfeit Sports Wear Seized at Two S.J. FleaMarket Raids". San Jose Mercury News. 1993-5-3.
 Gomez, Mark. "Flea-Market Future at Issue- ‘Transit Village’ Planned for Property". San Jose Mercury News. 2007-8-13.
 Gonzales, Sandra. "Fire Damages Flea Market". San Jose Mercury News. 2006-11-29.
 Gore, Robert J. "The Bazaar Growth of Swap Meets". Los Angeles Times. 1982-6-18.
 Eunjung Cha, Ariana. "Internet Threatens Old-Fashioned Sales Venues" Washington Post. 2005-8-2. 
 Hall, Christopher. "What’s Doing In San Jose". New York Times. 1998-4-12.
 Hendrickson, Steve. "Memorandum: Bay 101 Conditional Approval of Stock Transfer". 2007-9-13 
 Levander, Michelle. "Child Labor Exposed Employers Fined for Hours, Task Violation". San Jose Mercury News. 1992-6-17.
 Mercury News Staff Report. "San Jose Police Arrest 8 In Bogus Cassette Case." San Jose Mercury News. 1986-11-6.
 Rodriguez, Joe. "Discovering a World of Fruits and Vegetables". San Jose Mercury News. 2007-5-24.
 Rodriguez, Joe. "Produce Row Packs Them In". San Jose Mercury News. 2006-6-26.
 Sherbert, Erin. "The Waiting Game." The Metro Silicon Valley. 2007-9-12.
 Sherbert, Erin. "Twilight Zoning." The Metro Silicon Valley. 2007-11-14.
 Stein, Loren. "Wave Goodbye To the Train." The Metro Silicon Valley. 2002-12-26.
 Sulek, Julia. "Card Club Problems The Bay 101 Card Club in San Jose Has Been a Source of Controversy Within the Bumb Family". San Jose Mercury News. 2000-12-31.
 Vazquez, Daniel. "George Bumb Sr., Began Fleamarket". San Jose Mercury News. 2000-8-21.
 

Retail markets in the United States
Flea markets
Economy of San Jose, California
Culture of San Jose, California
Tourist attractions in San Jose, California
Shopping districts and streets in the San Francisco Bay Area
Events in the San Francisco Bay Area